Farmagudi is a suburb of Ponda town in Goa, India. It belongs to the Ponda taluk. It is located on a plateau 3 km from the main Ponda City on the way towards Panjim. It is home to the (GVM's) Higher Secondary School, GVM's College of Commerce & Economics, Ponda Education Society's Higher Secondary School, Colleges and The Goa Engineering College, National Institute of Technology, Goa, Indian Institute of Technology, Goa.

The famous Gopal Ganapati Temple and the Shivaji Fort is also located here along the road to Panaji.

Cities and towns in South Goa district